"If This Is It" is a song by English singer-songwriter and musician Newton Faulkner from his second studio album Rebuilt by Humans (2009). The song was released on September 11, 2009 as the album's lead single. The song was written by Adam Argyle, Newton Faulkner and produced by Mike Spencer. The song peaked to number 56 on the UK Singles Chart and number 29 on the Australian Singles Chart.

Track listing
Digital download EP
 "If This Is It" – 4:01
 "I Took It Out On You" (Live from Cheltenham Town Hall) – 3:10
 "If This Is It" (Live from Cheltenham Town Hall) – 4:13

Credits and personnel
 Lead vocals, acoustic guitar – Newton Faulkner
 Producer – Mike Spencer
 Lyrics – Newton Faulkner, Adam Argyle
 Label: Ugly Truth

Charts

Release history

References

2008 songs
2009 singles
Newton Faulkner songs
Songs written by Adam Argyle
Songs written by Newton Faulkner